John Wilbur Atwater (December 27, 1840 – July 4, 1910) was a U.S. Congressman from North Carolina between 1899 and 1901.

Early life and education 
Atwater was born near Fearrington, North Carolina in 1840. He attended common schools and the William Closs Academy.

Service with the Confederacy 
A farmer, he enlisted in the Confederate Army during the American Civil War, serving in Company D, First Regiment, of the North Carolina Volunteer Infantry.  Atwater was with the army of Gen. Robert E. Lee until the Lee's surrender at Appomattox.

Later career 
Atwater joined the Farmers' Alliance in 1887, and was the first president of the Chatham County Alliance. He was elected to the North Carolina Senate in 1890 as an Alliance Democrat; he was subsequently elected in 1892 and 1896 as a Populist. In 1898, as an Independent Populist, Atwater was sent to the 56th U.S. Congress, serving from March 4, 1899 to March 3, 1901. He unsuccessfully ran for re-election in 1900 and returned to farming.

Death and legacy 
He died in Fearington in 1910 and is buried in the Mount Pleasant Church Cemetery near Pittsboro.

References

External links

1840 births
1910 deaths
People from Chatham County, North Carolina
People's Party members of the United States House of Representatives from North Carolina
North Carolina state senators
Confederate States Army soldiers
North Carolina Independents
North Carolina Populists
Independent members of the United States House of Representatives
19th-century American politicians
Members of the United States House of Representatives from North Carolina